Pedro Antonio Zape (born June 3, 1949) is a former Colombian football goalkeeper who currently works as a goalkeeping coach.

Club career
Zape is considered to be one of the most important players in the history of Deportivo Cali. He was a member of three championship winning squads in 1969, 1970 and 1974.

International career
Zape played 47 times for the Colombia national team between 1972 and 1985. He played in three editions of the Copa América, including the 1975 tournament when Colombia finished as runners-up. He also played in Copa América 1979 and Copa América 1983.

Titles

References

Campeon America de cali 1986

External links
Deportivo Cali profile 

1949 births
Living people
Colombian footballers
Association football goalkeepers
Categoría Primera A players
Deportivo Cali footballers
Colombia international footballers
1975 Copa América players
1979 Copa América players
1983 Copa América players